Esma Ulqinaku was an Albanian politician. 

She was appointed Minister of Light Industry in 1982.

References

20th-century Albanian women politicians
Women government ministers of Albania